Kirkenes Station is a former railway station, located at Kirkenes in Sør-Varanger, Norway,  that was the terminus of the Kirkenes–Bjørnevatn Line. While the line still exists, it no longer has passenger service, instead serving the transport of iron ore from a nearby mine to the Port of Kirkenes.

References

Railway stations in Sør-Varanger
Railway stations opened in 1910
Disused railway stations in Norway
1910 establishments in Norway

Year of disestablishment missing